The Wellington South by-election of 1918 was a by-election held in the  electorate during the 19th New Zealand Parliament, on 19 December 1918. It was caused by the death of incumbent MP Alfred Hindmarsh, the leader of the Labour Party and was won by fellow party member Bob Semple with a majority of 1,231.

Background
Bob Semple, a miners agent who was previously the organiser of the New Zealand Federation of Labour, was selected as the Labour Party candidate. The nomination was subject of much interest. The unsuccessful aspirants were Tom Brindle, Alec Monteith, John Read, Michael Reardon and Tom Young.

Two Wellington City Councillors also stood as candidates. George Frost and John Castle offered themselves to the electorate, with Frost being endorsed by the Reform Party.

Results
The following table gives the election results:

References 

Wellington South
1918 elections in New Zealand
1910s in Wellington
December 1918 events
Events in Wellington
Politics of the Wellington Region